The 2012–13 Tennessee–Martin Skyhawks men's basketball team represented University of Tennessee at Martin during the 2012–13 NCAA Division I men's basketball season. The Skyhawks, led by fourth year head coach Jason James, played their home games at Skyhawk Arena and were members of the West Division of the Ohio Valley Conference. They finished the season 9–21, 5–11 in OVC play to finish in a tie for fourth place in the West Division. They lost in the first round of the Ohio Valley Conference tournament to Morehead State.

Roster

Schedule

|-
!colspan=9| Exhibition

|-
!colspan=9| Regular season

|-
!colspan=9| 2013 OVC Basketball tournament

References

UT Martin Skyhawks men's basketball seasons
Tennessee-Martin